The Maid of Orleans is a tragedy by Friedrich Schiller, premiered on 11 September 1801 in Leipzig. During his lifetime, it was one of Schiller's most frequently-performed pieces.

Plot
The play loosely follows the life of Joan of Arc. It contains a prologue introducing the important characters, followed by five acts. Each dramatizes a significant event in Joan's life. Up to act 4 the play departs from history in only secondary details (e.g. by having Joan kill people in battle, and by shifting the reconciliation between the Armagnacs and the Burgundians from 1435 to 1430). Thereafter, however, the plot is entirely free. Joan is about to kill an English knight when, on removing his helmet, she at once falls in love with him, and spares him. Blaming herself for what she regards as a betrayal of her mission, then, when at Reims she is publicly accused of sorcery, she refuses to defend herself, is assumed to be guilty, and dismissed from the French court and army. Captured by the English, she witnesses from her prison cell a battle in which the French are being decisively defeated, breaks her bonds, and dashes out to save the day. She dies as victory is won, her honour and her reputation both restored.

The line  (III, 6; Talbot) translates into English as "Against stupidity, the gods themselves battle in vain." This provided Isaac Asimov with the title of his novel The Gods Themselves.

Operatic adaptations
Giovanna d'Arco (1830) by Giovanni Pacini
Giovanna d'Arco (1845) by Giuseppe Verdi
The Maid of Orleans (1881) by Pyotr Ilyich Tchaikovsky
Das Mädchen aus Domrémy (1976) by Giselher Klebe

The English composer William Sterndale Bennett's Piano Sonata, Op. 46 (1873), is titled The Maid of Orleans with direct reference to Schiller's play, and includes quotations from the play at the head of each movement.

References

External links

, translated by Anna Swanwick
 
The Maid of Orleans, with short memoir of Schiller

Plays by Friedrich Schiller
1801 plays
Works about Joan of Arc
Tragedy plays
German plays adapted into films
Plays adapted into operas